Anneville (from Anslecvilla "the estate of Ansleicus") may refer to:

In France:
Anneville-Ambourville, Seine-Maritime, Normandy
Anneville-sur-Scie, Seine-Maritime, Normandy
Anneville-en-Saire, Manche, Normandy
Anneville-sur-Mer, Manche, Normandy
 In the Netherlands:
Anneville (Ulvenhout), a country estate in Ulvenhout
In the Republic of Ireland:
Anneville, County Clare, a townland in the civil parish of Killinaboy, barony of Inchiquin, County Clare
Anneville, County Laois, a townland in the civil parish of Shrule, barony of Slievemargy, County Laois
Anneville, County Meath (or Clonard Old), a townland in the civil parish of Clonard, barony of Upper Moyfenrath, County Meath
Anneville, County Westmeath (or Rathduff), a townland in the civil parish of Moylisker, barony of Fartullagh, County Westmeath

See also
Annoville
Annéville-la-Prairie